Jérôme Robart (born 27 May 1970) is a French actor, producer and playwright.

Early life 
Robart was trained at the French National Academy of Dramatic Arts in Paris, from 1993 to 1996, dividing his artistic activities between theatre and film, directing, acting, and writing.

Career 
In 2000, Jérôme Robart created his first play Tes which he directed and co-produced with the National Dramatic Centers of Bordeaux and Orléans.

In 2001, his second play, Eddy, f. de pute was coproduced by the Théâtre Ouvert of Paris, the National Dramatic Center of Bordeaux and Le Poche of Geneva. For France Culture, he also wrote Psychanalyse d’un vampire.

In 2003, he began formal studies in directing. This was an opportunity for him to collaborate notably with Bob Wilson and Claude Stratz.

In the theatre, Robart has been directed by Christophe Perton, Joël Jouanneau, Jorge Lavelli, Jean-Louis Thamin, and Stéphanie Loïk in plays by Rodrigo Garcia, Lionel Spycher, Luigi Pirandello, Bernard Manciet, and Jean Audureau.

In films, he has appeared in Charlie Says directed by Nicole Garcia. He has also worked with Alain Tanner, Marina de Van and Philippe Garrel.

From 2008 to 2017, he played the title role of an 18th-century Parisian police commissioner in the Nicolas Le Floch series of television films, broadcast in France on France 2, and inspired by the series of historical detective novels by Jean-François Parot.

Filmography

Film

Short

Television

Clip

Actor 
 1993 : Tranquille by Sinclair
 1995 : The Universal by Blur (band)
 2012 : L'incommunicabilité by Cécilia H.
 2014 : Ta bite by Circé Deslandes

Director 
 2011 : L'attente de Circé Deslandes, codirected with Cécilia Halatre
 2011 : Allô de Circé Deslandes, codirected with Cécilia Halatre
 2014 : Exquis cadavre, codirected with avec Circé Deslandes

Theatre

Actor 
 1995-1996 : Hélène by Jean Audureau, dir by Jean-Louis Thamin
 1996 : Per el Yiyo by Bernard Manciet, dir by Jean-Louis Thamin
 1997-1998 : Six Characters in Search of an Author by Luigi Pirandello, dir by Jorge Lavelli - Théâtre National Populaire in Villeurbanne, Théâtre de l'Eldorado
 1998-1999 : Pitbull by Lionel Spycher, dir by Joël Jouanneau
 2001 : 9 mm by Lionel Spycher, dir by Stéphanie Loïk
 2001-2003 : Notes de cuisine by Rodrigo Garcia, dir by Christophe Perton
 2005 : Marcia Hesse by Fabrice Melchiot, dir by Emmanuel Demarcy-Mota - Reims
 2007 : Three Sisters de Tchekhov, dir Astrid Bas - Théâtre de l'Odéon
 2007-2009 : La Corde sensible, cowritten with Vincent Ozanon - Théâtre Studio of Alfortville and Cirque Romanès
 2019 : L'Heureux Stratagème by Pierre de Marivaux, dir by Ladislas Chollat - Théâtre Édouard VII
 2020 : The Man Who Planted Trees by Jean Giono, lecture - Saint-Germain-de-Modéon

Author and director 
 2000 : Tes - Tour
 2003-2004 : Eddy, f. de pute - Théâtre Ouvert (Paris), Bordeaux 
 2005 : Chut ! Libre, cowritten with Juan Cocho
 2005 : Jiji the Lover - Théâtre de Poche, Geneva
 2007-2009 : La Corde sensible, cowritten with Vincent Ozanon - Théâtre Studio of Alfortville and Cirque Romanès
 2019 : Le Lait de Marie - Saint-Germain-de-Modéon

Awards 
 2017 : Festival des créations télévisuelles de Luchon : Best actor for Le Mari de mon mari
 2019 : Académie Alphonse Allais : Prix Jules Renard for Le Lait de Marie

Bibliography 
 2000 : Tes, Éditions Solitiaires intempestifs
 2000 : Psychanalyse d’un vampire, written for France Culture
 2001 : Eddy, f. de pute, Éditions Théâtre Ouvert Tapuscrit
 2003 : Civilisation de monstres
 2004 : Jiji the Lover, edited by Le Poche (Geneva), "Les inédits du poche"
 2010 : Jean la vengeance

References

External links 
 
 Jérôme Robart on VMA

1970 births
Living people
French male film actors
French male television actors
20th-century French dramatists and playwrights
21st-century French dramatists and playwrights
French theatre directors
French National Academy of Dramatic Arts alumni